Ben Proudfoot (born October 29, 1990) is a Canadian filmmaker. He is most noted as director of The Queen of Basketball, winner of the 2021 Academy Award for Best Documentary Short Subject; as well as codirector with Kris Bowers of the short documentary film A Concerto Is a Conversation, which was an Academy Award nominee for Best Documentary (Short Subject) at the 93rd Academy Awards in 2021.

Life and career
Born in Halifax, Nova Scotia, Proudfoot is of Scottish heritage. He was active as a sleight-of-hand magician in his youth, winning several international magic competitions, before attending film school at the USC School of Cinematic Arts. He launched his own film production company, Breakwater Studios, in 2012, and has directed a number of other short films including Dinner with Fred, ink&paper, Life's Work: Six Conversations with Makers and That's My Jazz.

On July 27, 2021, The New York Times website published a 16-minute film by Proudfoot about the life of astronomer Jocelyn Bell Burnell. Entitled "The Silent Pulse of the Universe," the film shows her instrumental role in the research on the discovery of pulsars and how she did not receive recognition for her work in the attribution of the Nobel Prize received by Antony Hewish and Martin Ryle. Bell Burnell also describes the extreme prejudice she faced at school, at university and in her career as a woman scientist.

On August 24, 2021, the Times website published another 16-minute film by Proudfoot. "Almost Famous: The First Report" profiles Jason Berry, the Louisiana reporter who broke the Catholic Church sex abuse scandal back in the 1980s — in large part, before the world was ready to listen. In 2002 The Boston Globe did much the same, this time garnering a Pulitizer Prize and inspiring the Academy Award-winning feature film Spotlight, whereas Berry spent ten unrewarding years trying to get traction for his amply documented stories of the church protecting and enabling pedophile priests.

Accolades
The Queen of Basketball, Proudfoot's film about women's basketball legend Lusia Harris, won the 2021 Academy Award for Best Documentary (Short Subject); Shaquille O'Neal and Steph Curry served as executive producers.

References

External links

1990 births
Canadian documentary film directors
Canadian magicians
Film directors from Nova Scotia
People from Halifax, Nova Scotia
Canadian people of Scottish descent
Living people
Directors of Best Documentary Short Subject Academy Award winners